Yanhecerida is a small order of Late Cambrian (mid-Stage 10) nautiloid cephalopods. They were similar to the more diverse Plectronocerida and Ellesmerocerida, with short shells, closely-spaced septa, and diaphragms (partitions) within the siphuncle. Their most distinctive trait is the conical shape of the diaphragms, similar to the endocones which characterize the later nautiloid order Endocerida. While some authors have argued that Yanhecerida should be lumped into Ellesmerocerida, a phylogenetic analysis has maintained that Yanhecerida is a valid clade of early cephalopods closely related to a paraphyletic Ellesmerocerida (and by extension all post-Cambian cephalopods).

References 

Prehistoric nautiloids
Prehistoric cephalopod orders
Furongian first appearances
Furongian extinctions